Hornopirén is a stratovolcano located in the Andes, in Los Lagos Region of Chile, south of Yate Volcano and east of Apagado or Hualiaque pyroclastic cone. Hornopirén lies on the major regional Liquine-Ofqui Fault. The volcano is said to have erupted in 1835, although no details are known. The name of the volcano derives from the Spanish word for oven, horno and the native Mapudungun word for snow pirén, thus Hornopirén means snow oven.

See also
 List of volcanoes in Chile
 Hornopirén National Park

References 
 

Stratovolcanoes of Chile
Mountains of Los Lagos Region
Volcanoes of Los Lagos Region
South Volcanic Zone
Holocene stratovolcanoes